Burr Oak Township is a township in Doniphan County, Kansas, USA.  As of the 2000 census, its population was 153.

Geography
According to the USGS, it contains four cemeteries: Columbus, Jackson, Moskau and Old Home.

The stream of Smith Creek runs through this township.

References
 USGS Geographic Names Information System (GNIS)

External links
 US-Counties.com
 City-Data.com

Townships in Doniphan County, Kansas
Townships in Kansas